HMS Childers was one of thirty-two  destroyers built for the Royal Navy during the Second World War, a member of the eight-ship Ch sub-class. Commissioned in 1945, she was built as a flotilla leader with additional accommodation for staff officers.

Design and description
The Ch sub-class was a repeat of the preceding Ca sub-class, except that the addition of remote control for the main-gun mounts caused some of the ships' intended weapons to be removed to save weight.

The ships were powered by a pair of geared steam turbines, each driving one propeller shaft using steam provided by two Admiralty three-drum boilers. As a flotilla leader, Childers complement was 222 officers and ratings.

The main armament of the destroyers consisted of four QF  Mk IV dual-purpose guns, one superfiring pair each fore and aft of the superstructure protected by partial gun shields. Their anti-aircraft suite consisted of one twin-gun stabilised Mk IV "Hazemeyer" mount for  Bofors guns and two single 2-pounder (40 mm) AA guns amidships, and single mounts for a  Oerlikon AA gun on the bridge wings. To compensate for the weight of the remote control equipment, one of the two quadruple 21-inch (533 mm) torpedo tube mounts was removed and the depth charge stowage was reduced to only 35. The ships were fitted with a pair of rails and two throwers for the depth charges.

Construction and career
Childers was originally intended to be ordered from Vickers-Armstrongs' shipyard in Barrow-in-Furness, but that facility was overloaded with work and the contract was switched to William Denny & Brothers. The ship was laid down on 27 November 1943 at its Dumbarton shipyard, launched on 27 February 1945 and was commissioned on 19 December.

In 1946 Childers was assigned to the 1st Destroyer Squadron based at Malta. She saw service, along with other Royal Navy ships in preventing illegal immigration into Palestine in 1947. Her pennant number was also later changed to D90 from R91. She returned to the UK in 1950 and was placed in reserve in 1951.  She was given an interim modernization in 1954, which saw her 'X' turret at the rear of the ship replaced by two Squid anti-submarine mortars.

In 1958 she was laid up in reserve at Gibraltar. Childers was never recommissioned and was subsequently sold for scrapping at La Spezia, arriving there on 22 September 1963.

References

Bibliography
 
 
 
 
 
 
 
 

 

1945 ships
Ships built on the River Clyde
C-class destroyers (1943) of the Royal Navy
World War II destroyers of the United Kingdom
Cold War destroyers of the United Kingdom